Chrome Shelled Regios is an anime adapted from the light novel series of the same title by Shūsuke Amagi and Miyū. It was directed by Itsuro Kawasaki and produced by the animation studio Zexcs. Set in the future in a polluted Earth where humanity is forced to live inside isolated mobile cities called Regios due to the prevalence of mutated creatures known as contaminoids and with Military Artists who wield kei energies to fight them, the anime plot follows Layfon Alseif, a new student in the academy city of Zuellni, as he reluctantly joins the 17th military arts platoon led by Nina Antalk and his uncertain future in the city.

It was broadcast on TV Kanagawa and TV Tokyo from January 10 to June 20, 2009. Other networks that aired the episodes at later dates include Chiba TV, Sun Television, Tokyo MX, TV Aichi, TV Hokkaido, TV Saitama, and TVQ Kyushu Broadcasting Co. The anime adaptation of the light novels was first confirmed on March 14, 2008 in the promotional cover of the eighth Chrome Shelled Regios light novel, and Kadokawa began to stream a trailer of the anime on November 25, 2008. The final episode of Chrome Shelled Regios was dedicated to production coordinator Tetsuya Koiso, who died nearly one month before the series ended.

Three pieces of theme music are used for the episodes: one opening theme and two closing themes. The opening theme, titled "Brave your truth", is performed by the Japanese band Daisy × Daisy. Both themes are performed by Chrome Shelled. Two singles containing the theme music and other tracks are planned for release on February 4, 2009. Twelve DVD compilations are planned for release by Kadokawa between March 27, 2009 and February 26, 2010.

Episode list

References
General

Specific

External links
Official website 

Chrome Shelled Regios